Michael J. Apter (born 1939) is a British psychologist who was born in England and grew up in Bristol. He was educated at Clifton College (1965) and at Bristol University where he gained both his Bachelor of Science degree and his Doctorate in Psychology in 1965, having also spent a doctoral year at Princeton University. He taught for twenty years at Cardiff University in Wales and has since held invited positions at Purdue University, the University of Chicago, Yale University, University of Toulouse, and Georgetown University. He also taught at Northwestern University where he received a teaching award. He has held visiting positions at several additional universities and is a chartered psychologist and fellow of the British Psychological Society.

Apter's work has been mainly in personality, in particular reversal theory. Since 2011 Apter has been Key Principal of Apter Research LLC in Louisiana, United States.

Selected works 

 Apter, Michael J. (1966) Cybernetics and Development. Oxford: Pergamon Press.    
 Apter, Michael J. (1970/2018) The Computer Simulation of Behaviour. London. Routledge. 
 Apter, Michael J. (1982) The Experience of Motivation: The Theory of Psychological Reversals, London Academic Press. 
 Apter, Michael J. (1992) The Dangerous Edge: The Psychology of Excitement. New York. The Free Press.                                                                                                                                                                                                                                                         
 Apter. Michael J. (2001) (Ed) Motivational Styles in Everyday Life. A Guide to Reversal Theory. Washington D.C.: American Psychological Association. 
 Apter. Michael J. (2007) Reversal Theory: The Dynamics of Motivation, Emotion and Personality 2nd, Edition. Oxford: Oneworld. 
 Apter, Michael J. (2018) Zigzag: Reversal and Paradox in Human Personality. Leicestershire U.K.: Matador.

References

Motivation
Personality
Artificial intelligence
British psychologists
Living people
1939 births
People from Stockton-on-Tees